The Komodo Armament D5 is an assault rifle produced by PT Komodo Armament Indonesia. The rifle uses the 5.56×45mm NATO intermediate cartridge. Like other Komodo Armament rifles, the D5 assault rifle is manufactured using polymer material, with cerakote or hard anodized finish. It has 4 picatinny rails at 9, 12, 3, and 6 o'clock positions. The barrel cover (hand guard) is a rail integration system (RIS) with several open cavities, making the heat dissipation process on the barrel faster when in full automatic firing mode. The barrel cover model is also designed to be lightweight but rigid. For the buttstock, the D5 adopts telescopic buttstock type of polymer material that can be adjusted. Polymer material is also used in the magazine, which contains 30 rounds. Local content for this weapon has reached 80%. What is currently imported is the material for making the barrel and the telescopic sight. The rifling and shaping process is carried out in Indonesia. The barrel life is about 6000 rounds,when constantly firing.

User 
: Used by Indonesian Navy

See also 

 Pindad SS1, former indonesian army service rifle
 Pindad SS2, current Indonesian army service rifle
 M4 Carbine, US Army service rifle
Komodo Armament D7, 7.62 mm semi auto rifle

References 

5.56×45mm NATO assault rifles
Post–Cold War military equipment of Indonesia
Assault rifles of Indonesia